Sebastiania bicalcarata is a species of flowering plant in the family Euphorbiaceae. It was originally described as Excoecaria bicalcarata Müll.Arg. in 1863. It is native to Goiás, Brazil.

References

Plants described in 1863
Flora of Brazil
bicalcarata